Manidinsky is a rural locality (a settlement) in Alexandrovskoye Rural Settlement, Talovsky District, Voronezh Oblast, Russia. The population was 72 as of 2010.

Geography 
Manidinsky is located 20 km northwest of Talovaya (the district's administrative centre) by road. Alexandrovka is the nearest rural locality.

References 

Rural localities in Talovsky District